Verona is an unincorporated community in Alameda County, California.

Name 
The name is from the estate of Phoebe Hearst La Hacienda del Pozo de Verona which was located nearby and the station at Verona was the nearest to the estate.

Verona shelter 
A small shelter named Verona was built in 1901. It served the local farmers in the area and had a nearby picnic area. The station was retired in March 1939.

References

External links

Unincorporated communities in California
Unincorporated communities in Alameda County, California